Tema General Hospital is a Ghanaian hospital located in Tema.

History 
In 1954, the Tema General Hospital was constructed to provide health services for workers who constructed the Tema Harbour. It was later handed over to the government for public use. It serves the communities of Nungua, Sakumono, Tema and Dangme West.

Services 

 The hospital provide services like internal medicine, general surgery, pediatrics, theatre, obstetrics, gynecological, accident and emergency service.
 The hospital also specializes in eye, dental, diabetic, sickle cell, and dermatology clinics with others being anaesthetic, chest, hypertensive.
 The hospital also supports services such as laboratory, blood bank, radiology, ultrasound scan, pharmacy and physiotherapy. They also accept National Health Insurance Scheme (NHIS).

References  

Hospitals in Ghana
Tema